Delete Reset Grow is the eleventh Mandarin studio album by Taiwanese Mandopop artist Rainie Yang. It was released on 27 November 2019 through EMI, her third album on the sublabel of Universal Music Taiwan.

This album marks Yang's first attempt at producing an album, with her taking the initiative in contacting the various songwriters. Thematically, the album discusses about the need to for one to 'delete' their weaknesses, 'reset' their courage, and 'grow' to become the best version of themselves.

The album's first single, "Celebration Of Oneself", was released on radio on Singles' Day. The lyrics of the song describe the loneliness that is felt during celebrations despite not being alone.

The album's title track, "Delete, Reset", was ranked 11th on Hit FM Top 100 Singles of the Year; "Celebration Of Oneself" and "Love is Love" were placed at 26th and 42nd respectively.

Track listing

Bonus

 Notes
 "Stranger" ("我不認識你") is the Cantonese version of "Embrace Your Imperfection" ("獻醜")

Music videos

References 

2019 albums
Rainie Yang albums
Universal Music Taiwan albums